This is the discography for the solo work of rock musician Juliana Hatfield.

Albums

Studio albums

Live album

Compilation album

EPs

Singles

Soundtrack appearances

Collaborations and various artist appearances

References

Rock music discographies
Discographies of American artists
Pop music discographies